Der Traum ein Leben, Op. 50, is a 1937 opera by Walter Braunfels based on Franz Grillparzer's 1834 . 

The opera's scheduled premiere under Bruno Walter in Vienna in 1938 was cancelled by the Nazis.

Recordings
Der Traum ein Leben – Marie-Luise Schilp, Otto von Rohr, Annelies Kupper, Heinrich Bensing, Alexander Welitsch, Orchester des Frankfurter Rundfunks, Kurt Schröder 1950

References

Operas
1937 operas
Operas by Walter Braunfels
Operas based on plays
Adaptations of works by Franz Grillparzer